Otto Schneitberger (born 29 September 1939) is a German former ice hockey player. He competed in the men's tournaments at the 1960, the 1964, the 1968 and the 1972 Winter Olympics.

References

External links
 

1939 births
Living people
Ice hockey players at the 1960 Winter Olympics
Ice hockey players at the 1964 Winter Olympics
Ice hockey players at the 1968 Winter Olympics
Ice hockey players at the 1972 Winter Olympics
Olympic ice hockey players of Germany
Olympic ice hockey players of the United Team of Germany
Olympic ice hockey players of West Germany
People from Bad Tölz-Wolfratshausen
Sportspeople from Upper Bavaria